In mathematics, especially in linear algebra and matrix theory, the duplication matrix and the elimination matrix are linear transformations used for transforming half-vectorizations of matrices into vectorizations or (respectively) vice versa.

Duplication matrix
The duplication matrix  is the unique  matrix which, for any  symmetric matrix , transforms  into :
.

For the  symmetric matrix , this transformation reads
 

The explicit formula for calculating the duplication matrix for a  matrix is: 

Where: 
 is a unit vector of order  having the value  in the position  and 0 elsewhere; 

Here is a C++ function using Armadillo (C++ library):
arma::mat duplication_matrix(const int &n) {
    arma::mat out((n*(n+1))/2, n*n, arma::fill::zeros);
    for (int j = 0; j < n; ++j) {
        for (int i = j; i < n; ++i) {
            arma::vec u((n*(n+1))/2, arma::fill::zeros);
            u(j*n+i-((j+1)*j)/2) = 1.0;
            arma::mat T(n,n, arma::fill::zeros);
            T(i,j) = 1.0;
            T(j,i) = 1.0;
            out += u * arma::trans(arma::vectorise(T));
        }
    }
    return out.t();
}

Elimination matrix
An elimination matrix  is a  matrix which, for any  matrix , transforms  into :
. 

Here is a C++ function using Armadillo (C++ library):
arma::mat elimination_matrix(const int &n) {
    arma::mat out((n*(n+1))/2, n*n, arma::fill::zeros);
    for (int j = 0; j < n; ++j) {
        arma::rowvec e_j(n, arma::fill::zeros);
        e_j(j) = 1.0;
        for (int i = j; i < n; ++i) {
            arma::vec u((n*(n+1))/2, arma::fill::zeros);
            u(j*n+i-((j+1)*j)/2) = 1.0;
            arma::rowvec e_i(n, arma::fill::zeros);
            e_i(i) = 1.0;
            out += arma::kron(u, arma::kron(e_j, e_i));
        }
    }
    return out;
}

For the  matrix , one choice for this transformation is given by
 .

Notes

References
.
Jan R. Magnus and Heinz Neudecker (1988), Matrix Differential Calculus with Applications in Statistics and Econometrics, Wiley. .
Jan R. Magnus (1988), Linear Structures, Oxford University Press. 

Matrices

de:Eliminationsmatrix